John Doyle (Dublin 1797 – 2 January 1868 London), known by the pen name H. B., was an Irish political cartoonist, caricaturist, painter and lithographer.

Early life and family 
He was the eldest son of a Dublin silk mercer, and came from a Roman Catholic family which in the 17th century had been granted extensive estates, possibly in County Offaly or County Laois, and their own coat of arms, but had suffered for their religion and since been dispossessed. In his youth he learned to paint landscapes under Gaspare Gabrielli, and miniature portraits at the Royal Dublin Society's drawing school under John Comerford. He won a gold medal in 1805. He was commissioned to paint equestrian portraits of the Marquess of Sligo and Lord Talbot, the Irish viceroy, and in 1822 he produced six prints entitled The Life of a Racehorse. That year he moved to London with his wife, Marianna Conan. His painting Turning out the Stag brought him recognition when it was exhibited at the Royal Academy in 1825.

Marianna died in 1832, giving birth to their seventh child. Doyle continued to exhibit miniatures until 1835, but by then he was experiencing greater success with his political cartoons, printed using the new reproductive medium of lithography, beginning in 1827. These were issued once a month during parliamentary sessions, and continued for twenty-two years. His caricatures were mostly faithful likenesses of their subjects, with little exaggeration, treated with sarcastic humour, often alluding to popular plays. They were signed with the letters H. B., constructed out of two Js and two Ds, Doyle's own initials. By 1840 he was prosperous enough to afford a fashionable house in Hyde Park, moving in the same circles as David Wilkie, Walter Scott, Samuel Taylor Coleridge, Charles Dickens, William Makepeace Thackeray, Thomas Macaulay, Thomas Moore and Samuel Rogers – but H. B.'s true identity remained a closely guarded secret until he revealed it in 1843 in a seventeen-page letter to Sir Robert Peel.

Career 
In the 1840s, at the height of his popularity, indices of H.B.'s prints were published in The Times and by the publisher McLean, but his reputation faded. His later prints were gentle in their humour and drawn in a soft, indistinct style. Thackeray said his cartoons, although clever and witty, were too "genteel" to raise more than a gentlemanly smile – "You will never hear any laughing at 'H. B.'" When he died in 1868, his obituary in The Art Journal did not appear until three months after his death, and a posthumous sale of his sketches at Christie's in 1882 was cancelled for lack of buyers. However, he is considered a founder of the school of British cartoon satirists represented by John Leech, John Tenniel, and his son Richard Doyle, which established the style made famous by Punch magazine. The British Museum has over 900 of his drawings in its collections.

Death and legacy 
He died at Maida Hill, 2 January 1868, and was buried at West Norwood Cemetery. His sons included the illustrator James William Edmund Doyle (1822–1892); the painter, illustrator and cartoonist Richard Doyle (1824–1883); Henry Edward Doyle, (1827–1892) who became director of the National Gallery of Ireland; and the painter Charles Altamont Doyle (1832–1893), through whom he was a grandfather of Sir Arthur Conan Doyle, the novelist and creator of Sherlock Holmes.

Gallery

References

Further reading
G. M. Trevelyan, The Seven Years of William IV. A Reign Cartooned by John Doyle (London: The Avalon Press, 1952).

External links

 portrait in chalk
University of Nottingham Digital Gallery includes John Doyle cartoons
Cartoons by John Doyle at the British Cartoon Archive

1797 births
1868 deaths
Irish illustrators
19th-century Irish painters
Irish male painters
Irish editorial cartoonists
Artists from Dublin (city)
Burials at West Norwood Cemetery
John
19th-century Irish male artists